Des Lyons (born 9 June 1938) is a former Australian rules footballer who played with Carlton in the Victorian Football League (VFL).

Lyons was from Barellan in the Riverina in southern NSW. A powerfully-built 183 cm forward, he had strong hands and a booming kick. As a teenager he briefly trained with  but returned home. As he matured, his talent was obvious, getting the attention of Carlton talent scouts.

Carlton managed to lure him down on permits in 1960, he played rounds 1 and 3  missing round 2 with injury. Shortly afterwards, Des told Carlton that he would not be continuing on. The lure of a family cartage business and the homesickness caused Des to return home.

Lyons resumed playing for Leeton helping the team to three Premierships. He won two League Best and Fairests, and was South West Football League's top goal-kicker in 1967 with 67 goals. He represented the SWDFL on 20 occasions.

Notes

External links 

Des Lyons's profile at Blueseum

1938 births
Carlton Football Club players
Australian rules footballers from New South Wales
Living people